Events from the year 1349 in Ireland.

Incumbent
Lord: Edward III

Events

Christmas to March – the Black Death: "The pestilence gathered strength in Kilkenny during Lent ... there was scarcely a house in which only one died."
Flaithbheartach Domnall Carrach Ó Ruairc deposed from kingship of West Bréifne.
In the dispute over the Primacy of Ireland, Richard FitzRalph, Archbishop of Armagh, acting on letters of King Edward III of England specifically allowing him to do so, enters Dublin "with the cross erect before him". He is opposed by the prior of Kilmainham on the instructions of Alexander de Bicknor, Archbishop of Dublin, and forced to withdraw to Drogheda.

Births

Deaths
After June – Friar John Clyn.
14 July – Alexander de Bicknor, Archbishop of Dublin.
Risdeard mac Giolla Iosa Ruaidh Ó Raghallaigh, Lord of East Breifne.

References

"The Annals of Ireland by Friar John Clyn", edited and translated with an Introduction, by Bernadette Williams, Four Courts Press, 2007. , pp. 240–244.
"A New History of Ireland VIII: A Chronology of Irish History to 1976", edited by T. W. Moody, F.X. Martin and F.J. Byrne. Oxford, 1982. .
http://www.ucc.ie/celt/published/T100001B/index.html
http://www.ucc.ie/celt/published/T100005C/index.html
http://www.ucc.ie/celt/published/T100010B/index.html

 
1340s in Ireland
Ireland
Years of the 14th century in Ireland